The sixth season of RuPaul's Drag Race All Stars premiered on June 24 and concluded on September 2, 2021. The first two episodes of the season aired on the same day. On August 20, 2020, VH1 renewed both RuPaul's Drag Race and All Stars for its thirteenth and sixth season respectively. On February 24, 2021, ViacomCBS announced the sixth season of the show would move from VH1 to Paramount+, an online streaming service. However, the season is still broadcast by the same networks abroad. 

The cast was announced via the RuPaul's Drag Race YouTube channel on May 26, 2021.

The winner of RuPaul's Drag Race All Stars received a one-year supply of Anastasia Beverly Hills Cosmetics and a cash prize of $100,000. Kylie Sonique Love was declared as the winner, with Eureka!, Ginger Minj, and Ra'Jah O'Hara as runners-up.

Contestants 

(Ages, names, and cities stated are at time of filming.)

Notes:

Contestant progress

Lip syncs
Legend:

Notes:

Voting history
Legend:

 

Notes:

Guest judges
Listed in chronological order:

Big Freedia, rapper
Tia Mowry, actress
Jamal Sims, choreographer
Aisha Tyler, actress and comedian
Emma Roberts, actress and singer
Zaldy, fashion designer
Tina Knowles, businesswoman and fashion designer
Charli XCX, English singer and songwriter
Justin Simien, filmmaker and actor

Special guests
Guests who appeared in episodes, but did not judge on the main stage.

Episode 1
Miss Piggy (Eric Jacobson), Muppet character

Episode 5
Bianca Del Rio, drag queen, winner of the sixth season of RuPaul's Drag Race

Episode 6
Angela Bassett, actress and director

Episode 7
Leland, songwriter and record producer
Freddy Scott, composer and actor

Episode 8
Cheyenne Jackson, actor and singer
Fortune Feimster, writer, comedian and actress

Episode 9
Bianca Del Rio as Dina Saur from Drag Tots
Latrice Royale as Lady Liber-T	from Drag Tots

Episode 11
Alec Mapa, actor and comedian
Jermaine Fowler, actor and writer

Episode 12
Tanya Tucker, singer
Jamal Sims, choreographer
Shea Couleé, drag queen, winner of the fifth season of RuPaul's Drag Race All Stars

Episodes

References

2021 American television seasons
RuPaul's Drag Race All Stars seasons
2021 in LGBT history